The River Farg is a small tributary of the River Earn, located in the lieutenancy area of Perth and Kinross, central Scotland.

Course 
Its source is located in Glen Farg reservoir; it winds round roads and farms, and has been forced in many places to change course due to human interference. It ends in a confluence where it joins the Earn.

Etymology 
The name Farg may represent an Old Gaelic adaption of Brittonic *wergā, meaning "anger" (c.f. Welsh gwery).

History 
The river was once a boundary of the Lordship and Barony of Balvaird.

The river was polluted with aluminium sulphate killing nearly all of the fish in May 2014.  Scottish Water was fined £8,000 for the incident.

References 

Farg